The Money Club is a business news talk show aired weekdays from 7 to 7:30 PM ET on CNBC until c. 1997. Hosted by Brenda Buttner.

The Money Club was a personal finance show focused on making and saving money. Targeted at casual as well as seasoned investors, the show featured such regular segments as "Money Matters," "Getting Started," "Mutual Fund Investor," "Of Mutual Interest," "Cashing Out," "Winners and Losers," "Worldwise" and "Books & Bytes." Many of the segments were interactive via viewer call-ins and on-line services. Additionally, investor Jimmy Rogers was a regular Friday night guest on the show.

CNBC original programming
1990s American television news shows
Year of television series debut missing
1990s American television talk shows
Year of television series ending missing
Business-related television series
1997 American television series endings